The following is a list of events relating to television in Ireland from 2004.

Events

January
January – The licence fee increases by €2.

February
2 February – The Granada plc share of TV3 is taken over by ITV plc upon the merger of Granada with Carlton.

Mach
No events

April
No events

May
24 May – Sky News Ireland is launched.

June
June – The Public Service Broadcasting Charter is published by Dermot Ahern, the Minister for Communications, Marine and Natural Resources.

July
No events

August
No events

September
29 September – Noel Dempsey is appointed Minister for Communications, Marine and Natural Resources.

October
2 October – Network 2 is rebranded as RTÉ Two.

November
November – RTÉ publishes its RTÉ Guiding Principles – Implementing the Public Service Broadcasting Charter.

December
No events

Debuts

RTÉ
5 January – Proof on RTÉ One (2004–2005)
16 January –  Super Duper Sumos on RTÉ Two (2002–2003)
23 March –  Snailsbury Tales on RTÉ Two (2002–2005)
4 May –  Astro Boy on RTÉ Two (2003–2004)
30 June –  Fergus McPhail on RTÉ Two (2004)
4 September –  Little Red Tractor on RTÉ Two (2004–2007)
7 September –  Kid Paddle on RTÉ Two (2003–2006)
14 September –  Pingu on RTÉ Two (2003–2006)
9 September – Hanging with Hector on RTÉ One (2004–2008)
18 October – Tubridy Tonight on RTÉ One (2004–2009)
1 November –  Foreign Exchange on RTÉ Two (2004)
Autumn – The Afternoon Show on RTÉ One (2004–2010)
Undated – Ryan Confidential  on RTÉ One (2004–2010)
Undated - Tru Calling (2003-2005)

TG4
6 January –  X-DuckX (2001–2006)

Changes of network affiliation

Ongoing television programmes

1960s
RTÉ News: Nine O'Clock (1961–present)
RTÉ News: Six One (1962–present)
The Late Late Show (1962–present)

1970s
The Late Late Toy Show (1975–present)
RTÉ News on Two (1978–2014)
The Sunday Game (1979–present)

1980s
Dempsey's Den (1986–2010)
Questions and Answers (1986–2009)
Fair City (1989–present)
RTÉ News: One O'Clock (1989–present)

1990s
Would You Believe (1990s–present)
Winning Streak (1990–present)
Prime Time (1992–present)
Nuacht RTÉ (1995–present)
Fame and Fortune (1996–2006)
Nuacht TG4 (1996–present)
Ros na Rún (1996–present)
A Scare at Bedtime (1997–2006)
The Premiership/Premier Soccer Saturday (1998–2013)
Sports Tonight (1998–2009)
TV3 News (1998–present)
The View (1999–2011)
Ireland AM (1999–present)
Telly Bingo (1999–present)

2000s
Nationwide (2000–present)
TV3 News at 5.30 (2001–present)
You're a Star (2002–2008)
Play it Again Des (2003–2005)
Auld Ones (2003–2007)
Killinaskully (2003–2008)
The Clinic (2003–2009)
The Panel (2003–2011)
Against the Head (2003–present)
news2day (2003–present)
Other Voices (2003–present)

Ending this year
April – Open House (1999–2004)
23 July – All Kinds of Everything (2003–2004)
14 August – Agenda (1999–2004)
29 October- Reeling In The Years but was back with 2000's in 2010 & 2010's in 2021.

See also
2004 in Ireland

References